Amphritea atlantica is a Gram-negative, aerobic, rod-shaped and motile bacterium from the genus of Amphritea which has been isolated from the mussel Bathymodiolus from the Logatchev hydrothermal vent field.

References

Oceanospirillales
Bacteria described in 2008